Gaëtan Mittelheisser (born 26 July 1993) is a French badminton player. He started playing badminton at aged 5. In 2012, he won the French National Badminton Championships in the men's doubles event, and in 2013 he joined the France national badminton team. In 2013, he also won the bronze medal at the Mediterranean Games in the men's doubles event.

Achievements

European Games 
Mixed doubles

Mediterranean Games 
Men's doubles

BWF International Challenge/Series 
Men's doubles

Mixed doubles

  BWF International Challenge tournament
  BWF International Series tournament
  BWF Future Series tournament

References

External links 
 

1993 births
Living people
Sportspeople from Haut-Rhin
French male badminton players
Badminton players at the 2015 European Games
European Games silver medalists for France
European Games medalists in badminton
Competitors at the 2013 Mediterranean Games
Mediterranean Games bronze medalists for France
Mediterranean Games medalists in badminton
21st-century French people